Donald Michael Devitt (11 July 1921 – 10 July 2008) was an Australian politician. Born in Launceston, Tasmania, he was educated at state schools before becoming a council clerk. He served in the military 1942–1945, after which he became a farmer and high school bursar. In 1964, he was elected to the Australian Senate as a Labor Senator for Tasmania. He held the seat until his retirement in 1977.

References

1921 births
2008 deaths
Australian Labor Party members of the Parliament of Australia
Members of the Australian Senate for Tasmania
Members of the Australian Senate
20th-century Australian politicians
Politicians from Launceston, Tasmania